This list contains the toponyms (place names) in Muisca, the language of the Muisca who inhabited the Colombian Altiplano Cundiboyacense before the Spanish conquest of the Muisca in the 1530s. The name of the language of the Muisca is called Chibcha, Muisca or, in its own language, Muysccubun. Muisca means "man", "person" or "people".

Most names of the Muisca have been kept by the Spanish colonists, though some are slightly altered through time. A number of names refer to the farmfields (tá) or other geographical features of the region. The name of the department of Cundinamarca is an exception, it is inferred the name comes not from Chibcha, yet from Quechua, meaning condor's nest.

Chibcha language toponyms outside the Muisca Confederation territories, such as the Guane, Lache, U'wa or Sutagao and Spanish language toponyms within the Muisca Confederation are not included.

Muisca toponyms

See also 

 List of flora and fauna named after the Muisca
 Muisca Confederation
 Muysccubun
 List of placenames of indigenous origin in the Americas
 List of Mapudungun placenames

References

Bibliography

External links 
  El significado del nombre Boyacá y sus pueblos

Muisca
Toponyms
¤